A hook is a tool with a curved end.

Hook may also refer to:

Places

United Kingdom
 Hook, East Riding of Yorkshire, a village and civil parish
 Hook, Hart, Hampshire, a small town and civil parish
 Hook railway station
 Hook, Fareham, Hampshire, a village
 Hook, London, a suburban area
 Hook, Pembrokeshire, a village
 Hook, Wiltshire, a small village

Other
 Hook Island, Queensland, Australia
 Hook Point, Queensland, Australia
 Hook Peninsula, County Wexford, Ireland
 Hook, New Zealand
 Hook River, New Zealand
 Hook of Holland or The Hook, a port town in the Netherlands
 Hook granite massif, Zambia

Language
 Hook (diacritic), a diacritical mark attached to letters in various alphabets
 Hook above, a diacritical mark above letters in the Vietnamese alphabet
 Rhotic hook, a diacritical mark attached to symbols in the International phonetic alphabet

Arts and entertainment

Characters
 Hook (Transformers), several characters in the Transformers universe
 Captain Hook, a fictional pirate in J. M. Barrie's play Peter Pan and other works
 Mr. Hook, a character in several 1940s American animated cartoon shorts produced for the US Navy
 Trooper Hook, the title character of Trooper Hook, a 1957 Western film, played by Joel McCrea

Television and film
 Hook (film), a 1991 fantasy film by Steven Spielberg continuing J. M. Barrie's Peter and Wendy
 The Hook (1963 film), a 1963 Korean War war film
 The Hook (1976 film), a 1976 giallo film
 The Hook (2004 film), a 2004 French thriller film
 Hook (2022 TV series), a program broadcast by ARY Digital

Other arts and entertainment
 Narrative hook, a literary technique designed to grab the reader's interest
 The Hook (album), by Jukka Tolonen
 "Hook" (Blues Traveler song), from their 1994 album, Four
 Hook (music), a catchy musical passage
 The Hook (screenplay), an unproduced screenplay by playwright Arthur Miller
 Hook (video game), four video games based on the Spielberg film

Sports
 Hook (bowling), a curving ball
 Hook (boxing), a boxing punch
 Hook (cricket), a shot in cricket
 Hook shot, a type of shot in basketball
 Hooking (ice hockey), a penalty
 Hook, part of the hook and ladder trick play in football
 Hook shot, in a type of misplayed golf shot
 Curveball, a type of baseball pitch

People
 Hook (surname), a list of people
 Hook (nickname), a list of people
 Hook., author abbreviation of English botanist William Jackson Hooker (1785–1865)
 Hook.f., author abbreviation of English botanist Joseph Dalton Hooker (1817–1911), the son of William Jackson Hooker

Other uses
 Hook (computer programming), a computer programming technique
 Telephone hook, an electrical switch which indicates when the telephone has been hung up
 Mil Mi-6, a Soviet/Russian heavy transport helicopter nicknamed "Hook"
 The Hook, a classic urban legend
 The Hook (newspaper), a weekly Virginia newspaper from 2002 to 2013
 WFFM, a radio station licensed to Ashburn, Georgia, formerly branded "Hook FM"
 Angle (journalism)

See also
 
 
 Hooke (disambiguation)
 Hooked (disambiguation)
 Hooks (disambiguation)
 Hook echo, a feature visible on radar indicative of tornadic rotation in a thunderstorm